The 1902–03 team finished with a record 1–5. It was the second and final year for head coach Clayton T. Teetzel. The team captain was R.C. Smith and team manager was C.B. Jordan.

Roster

Schedule

|-
!colspan=9 style="background:#006633; color:#FFFFFF;"| Non-conference regular season

References

Eastern Michigan Eagles men's basketball seasons
Michigan State Normal